The 1965 Cape South Easter Trophy was a non-championship Formula One race held at Killarney on January 9, 1965, one week after the South African Grand Prix.

Results

References 

Cape South Easter Trophy
Auto races in South Africa
Cape South Easter Trophy
Cape South Easter Trophy